Cuyoc (possibly from Quechua kuyuy to move, "the one that moves"), also known as: Puyoc (possibly from Quechua phuyu cloud, -q a suffix, "the cloudy one"), is a mountain in the south of the Huayhuash mountain range in the Andes of Peru, about  high. It is located in the Lima Region, Cajatambo Province, Cajatambo District. Cuyoc lies north of Pumarinri.

References

Mountains of Peru
Mountains of Lima Region